Terence Mophuting (1965–2008) was a Botswanan footballer. A defender, he played for the Botswana national football team between 1992 and 2000.

External links

Terrence Mophuthing (17 November 1965 – 1 December 2008) was a football player from Botswana who first made his name at Gaborone United where he started his playing career in the 1980s.
He was a powerhouse at GU with his dangerous runs from the left back. He was part of the national team, which defeated Malawi during Botswana's 20th anniversary of independence in 1986.
In the late 1980s, Mophuting sneaked into neighbouring South Africa to join Kaizer Chiefs who later loaned him to other clubs.
He came back to his home country Botswana and played for several clubs. When an exodus of top players trooped to Extension Gunners in the early 1990s, Mophuting was among them. He was instrumental in the crack Gunners' squad that clinched the national title for three years in a row.
His last club was Notwane which he also coached after retirement. Mophuting was a versatile player who could feature in any position including the goalkeeping department. He was a disciplined player and he rarely received red cards.

Mophuthing died on 1 December 2008 in Jwaneng hospital after a short illness

1965 births
2008 deaths
Botswana footballers
Association football defenders